Kerwin Mathews (January 8, 1926 – July 5, 2007) was an American actor best known for playing the titular heroes in The 7th Voyage of Sinbad (1958), The Three Worlds of Gulliver (1960) and Jack the Giant Killer (1962).

Early life 
Mathews was born on January 8, 1926, in Seattle, Washington, and was two years old when he moved with his divorced mother to Janesville, Wisconsin, where he attended Janesville High School, graduating in 1943. Mathews said that "a kind high school teacher put me in a play, and that changed my life."

After serving in the United States Army Air Forces during World War II as a pilot and swimming instructor, he attended and performed at nearby Milton College for two years before transferring to Beloit College on drama and music scholarships. He remained at Beloit three years after graduation teaching speech and dramatic arts and appeared in regional theatre. He also taught high school English in Lake Geneva, Wisconsin.

Columbia Pictures 
After moving to Los Angeles in 1954, Mathews acted at the Pasadena Playhouse, including a production of Comedy of Error. While there he met the head of casting for Columbia Pictures, leading to a seven-year studio contract.

One of his first roles was in the episode "The Escape of Mr. Proteus" in Space Patrol. He had an uncredited bit in Cell 2455, Death Row (1955) for Columbia. His first credited film role was in 5 Against the House (1955), an early role for Kim Novak. His pay was $200 per week. Mathews then was cast in the title role of a treatment of Joseph and his Brethren with Rita Hayworth. However, the film was cancelled shortly before filming started.

Mathews appeared in several episodes of The Ford Television Theatre as well as episodes of Playhouse 90 and Matinee Theatre.

Mathews' first sizable role was as Lee J. Cobb's son in The Garment Jungle (1957). He was promoted to star for Tarawa Beachhead (1958), a war film produced by Charles Schneer. Schneer liked the actor's work and cast him in the role of Sinbad in The 7th Voyage of Sinbad (1958), directed by Nathan Juran with effects by Ray Harryhausen. The movie was a big success and remains Mathews' most famous film. Juran called Mathews "the epitome of professionalism." He was announced for Stop 424 to be shot in Australia by Columbia but the film was not made.

Mathews co-starred with Van Johnson in The Last Blitzkrieg (1959), a war film for Sam Katzman, and Man on a String (1960) with Ernest Borgnine (Mathews replaced Cliff Robertson for the latter). In The Last Blitzkrieg Mathews was cast against type as a fanatical Nazi. He did an episode of Goodyear Theatre and went to Italy to make The Warrior Empress (1960) with Tina Louise. He was on stand by to replace Dirk Bogarde on Song Without End (1960) when Bogarde was clashing with the director.

Schneer cast Mathews in an unofficial follow up to The 7th Voyage of Sinbad, The 3 Worlds of Gulliver (1960), playing the title role, with effects by Harryhausen. Columbia then put him in a prestigious film, The Devil at 4 O'Clock (1961), billed underneath Frank Sinatra and Spencer Tracy.

Mathews went to England to star in a swashbuckler film for Hammer Films released through Columbia, The Pirates of Blood River (1962). Edward Small cast him as Jack the Giant Killer (1962), directed by Juran, an attempt to repeat the success of Sinbad only without Harryhausen or Schneer.

Hammer called him back for Maniac (1963), a psycho thriller released by Columbia. He then left Columbia.

Freelance actor 
Mathews went to France to play Jean Bruce's OSS 117 in OSS 117 se déchaîne (1964). In Hollywood, he played Johann Strauss Jr. in the Disney two-part telefilm The Waltz King (1963), which was his favorite role.

He did another OSS 117 film, Panic in Bangkok (1964), then starred in The Viscount (1967), also from a novel by Bruce. In between, he starred in a pilot for Ghost Breakers, a TV show that did not go to series.

Mathews starred in some low-budget films, such as Battle Beneath the Earth (1968) filmed in England and The Killer Likes Candy (1968). He had supporting parts in A Boy... a Girl (1969) directed by John Derek and Dead of Night: A Darkness at Blaisedon (1969), a pilot for a proposed series that was not picked up.

Later career 
Mathews had supporting roles in Barquero (1970), the TV movie Death Takes a Holiday (1971), and Octaman (1971). He guest-starred on General Hospital and Ironside. His last lead was The Boy Who Cried Werewolf (1973), directed by Juran.

Retirement and death 
Mathews retired from acting in 1978 and moved to San Francisco, where he ran a clothing and antiques shop. Mathews died in his sleep in San Francisco on July 5, 2007, at the age of 81.

He was survived by his partner of 46 years, Tom Nicoll, a British display manager at Harvey Nichols, the British luxury department store. The two met in 1961.

Legacy 
The city of Janesville renamed a one-block street adjacent to the former Janesville High School as Kerwin Mathews Court. The renovated building houses the Janesville Performing Arts Center.

Filmography

Film 
Cell 2455 Death Row (1955) – Reporter (uncredited)
5 Against the House (1955) – Ronnie
The Garment Jungle (1957) – Alan Mitchell
Tarawa Beachhead (1958) – Sgt. Thomas A. 'Tom' Sloan
The 7th Voyage of Sinbad (1958) – Sinbad
The Last Blitzkrieg (1959) – Wilitz
Man on a String (1960) – Bob Avery
The Warrior Empress (1960) – Phaon
The 3 Worlds of Gulliver (1960) – Dr. Lemuel Gulliver
The Devil at 4 O'Clock (1961) – Father Joseph Perreau
Pirates of Blood River (1962) – Jonathon Standing
Jack the Giant Killer (1962) – Jack
Maniac (1963) – Jeff Farrell
OSS 117 Is Unleashed (1963, ‡) – Hubert Bonisseur de La Bath, alias OSS 117
Shadow of Evil (1964, ‡) – Hubert Bonisseur de La Bath / OSS 117 / Tony Burt
 The Viscount (1967) – Clint de la Roche, le Vicomte
Battle Beneath the Earth (1967) – Cmdr. Jonathan Shaw
The Killer Likes Candy (1968) – Mark
A Boy... a Girl (1969) – Mr. Christian
Barquero (1970) – Marquette
Octaman (1971) – Dr. Rick Torres
The Boy Who Cried Werewolf (1973) – Robert Bridgestone
Nightmare in Blood (1978) – Prince Zaroff (final film role)

‡ OSS 117 film

Television 
Space Patrol
The Escape of Mr Proteus (1954) – Major Caldwell
Ford Theatre
Charlie C company (1954) – Lt. Norton
The Lady in the Wind (1955) – Ivor
Catch at Straws (1956) – Fred Karns
Playhouse 90
The Country Husband (1956) – Clay Farrell
Matinee Theatre
Show of Strength (1957)
The Suicide Club (1958)
Goodyear Television Playhouse
The Obenauf Story (1959, †) – Lieutenant James Obenauf
Walt Disney's Wonderful World of Color
The Waltz King (1963) (two parts) – Johann Strauss Jr.
Ghostbreaker (1967, TV Movie, †) – Dr. Barnaby Cross
Dead of Night: A Darkness at Blaisedon (1969, TV movie, †) – Jonathan Fletcher
Ironside
Death Takes a Holiday (1971, TV Movie) – Senator Earl Chapman, Jr.
"Hey, Buddy, Can You Spare a Life?" (1972) – Eric Oates
"Achilles' Heel" (1972) – Paul Arnstein

† Pilots for unsold series

References

Notes

External links 

Kerwin Mathews
The Final Taxi Podcast on Kerwin Mathews

1926 births
2007 deaths
Male actors from Wisconsin
American male film actors
American male television actors
Beloit College alumni
Milton College alumni
Military personnel from Seattle
American gay actors
People from Janesville, Wisconsin
LGBT people from Wisconsin
20th-century American male actors
Joseph A. Craig High School alumni
United States Army Air Forces pilots of World War II
Columbia Pictures contract players
20th-century American LGBT people
Military personnel from Wisconsin